Blast the Human Flower is an album by the English experimental musician Danielle Dax. It was her first album recorded while signed to Sire Records.

All words were written by Dax, and the music was written by Dax and David Knight except for "Daisy" and "16 Candles", for which the music was written by Dax alone, and "Tomorrow Never Knows", a cover of the Lennon/McCartney song.

All tracks were produced by Stephen Street except "Bayou" and "Daisy", which were produced by Street and Dax.

Dax provided vocals and played keyboards and guitar. Other musicians on the record are David Knight, who played keyboards, guitar and bass, Stephen Street, also on keyboards, guitar and bass and Peter Farrugia on guitar and bass. David Cross and Anna Palm both played violin.
Karl Blake played guitars on King Crack.

The cover artwork is by Stylorouge.

Track listing 

 "The Id Parade" (3:51)
 "Tomorrow Never Knows" (5:16) - also on Tomorrow Never Knows EP, along with other versions of the track
 "Big Blue '82'" (4:17)
 "Bayou" (4:09)
 "King Crack" (2:10) - also on Tomorrow Never Knows EP
 "Daisy" (3:55)
 "Dead Man's Chill" (4:42)
 "The Living and Their Stillborn" (5:11)
 "Jehovah's Precious Stone" (5:08)
 "16 Candles" (5:36)

References

External links
 Entertainment Weekly article

Danielle Dax albums
1990 albums
Sire Records albums
Albums produced by Stephen Street